Cesatiella is a genus of fungi in the family Hyponectriaceae.

The genus name of Cesatiella is in honour of Vincenzo Barone di Cesati (1806 - 1883), an Italian botanist and Professor of Botany and Director of the Botanical Garden of Naples, Italy.

The genus was circumscribed by Pier Andrea Saccardo in Michelia Vol.1 (Issue 2) on page 250 in 1878.

Species
As accepted by Species Fungorum;
Cesatiella australis 
Cesatiella lancastriensis 
Cesatiella rehmiana 

Former species; C. polyblasta  = Phragmocalosphaeria polyblasta, Calosphaeriaceae

References

External links
Index Fungorum

Xylariales